Sântimbru or Sîntimbru (in old grammar) may refer to several places:

 Sântimbru, Alba, a commune in Alba County
 Sântimbru, Harghita, a commune in Harghita County